Gayane Kostanyan (born 20 July 1988) is an Armenian footballer who plays as a forward. As a member and captain of the Armenian women's national football team.
She played in different countries Russia, Ukraine, Lebanon, Kazakhstan and now in France.
In 2004 she was recognized as the best player of the year (16 years old).
In 2015, she started coaching the girls at the club Football Association Marseille Féminin (France).

Career
 Finalist of the Russian Women's Cup in 2014
 Finalist of the Kazakhstani Women's Cup and 3rd place in 2015.
 Winner the cup Ukraine 2012 year 
 Top scorer and captain of the Armenia women's national football team
 Six-time champion of Armenia.
 Armenia's Cup winner (2004-2005, 2005-2006, 2006–2007).
 In 2004 The best player of Armenia.
 FC "College" - "Norway Cup", a bronze medal (2007), (2010)-Armenia
 FC "Homenmen" - bronze medal (2008), Silver Medal (2009)-Lebanon
 FC "Naftekhimik" - silver medal (2012-2013)-Ukrain

See also
List of Armenia women's international footballers

References

External links

 Gayanekostanyan. Football Federation of Armenia, Retrieved 11 December 2018.
 Match 3/3/2011, Retrieved 11 December 2018.
 http://www.uefa.com/womenseuro/news/newsid=617022.html  (link error)
 16-YEAR-OLD GAYANE KOSTANYAN IS THE BEST FEMALE FOOTBALL PLAYER, Retrieved 11 December 2018.
 УЗНАВАЯ "КУБАНОЧКУ", Retrieved 11 December 2018.
 Татьяна Зайцева: О женском футболе, "Кубаночке" и амбициях, Retrieved 11 December 2018.
 ФК «Кубаночка» подведет итоги за минувший сезон, Retrieved 11 December 2018.
 Womenseuro, photos, Retrieved 11 December 2018.
 Костанян возглавила список бомбардиров, Retrieved 11 December 2018.

1988 births
Living people
Women's association football forwards
Armenian women's footballers
Armenia women's international footballers
Russian Women's Football Championship players
Kubanochka Krasnodar players
Armenian expatriate footballers
Armenian expatriate sportspeople in Russia
Expatriate women's footballers in Russia